Max Gladstone (born May 28, 1984) is an American fantasy author. He is best known for his 2012 debut novel Three Parts Dead, which is part of The Craft Sequence, his urban fantasy serial Bookburners, and for co-writing This Is How You Lose the Time War.

Gladstone is a graduate of Yale University, where he studied Chinese.  He has worked in China, including as a teacher in a rural area of Anhui from 2006 to 2008, and as a translator for a car magazine. In 2013, Gladstone was a finalist for the 2012 John W. Campbell Award for Best New Writer.

Career

The Craft Sequence 
Gladstone's first novel, Three Parts Dead, was published by Tor Books on October 2, 2012, to positive reception. It was followed by Two Serpents Rise in 2013, Full Fathom Five in 2014, Last First Snow in 2015, and Four Roads Cross in 2016, all part of his Craft Sequence. Publication of the Craft Sequence has moved to Tor.com. The sixth novel, Ruin of Angels, was published by Tor.com in 2017. It will be followed by both novels and novella-length works starting in 2018.

Serial Box Publishing 
In September 2015, Serial Box Publishing launched Bookburners, a weekly urban fantasy serial created by Gladstone, and written by a team of authors consisting of himself, Margaret Dunlap, Mur Lafferty, and Brian Francis Slattery. The first season ran from September to December 2015 for 16 episodes: Gladstone wrote the pilot as well as episodes 7, 11, and 16. In January 2016, Serial Box renewed Bookburners for a second season, set to premiere in Summer 2016.

Gladstone's newest serial, The Witch Who Came in from the Cold, co-created with Lindsay Smith, launched in January 2016 from Serial Box. The serial, written by Gladstone, Smith, Cassandra Rose Clarke, Ian Tregillis, and Michael Swanwick, is a Cold War supernatural spy thriller set in the 1970s. The first season is set to run for 13 episodes. Simon and Schuster's Saga Press imprint released print collections of the first season of Bookburners in January 2017. A collection of season one of The Witch Who Came in From the Cold will be published in June 2017.

Other work 
Gladstone is to write a Pathfinder Roleplaying Game tie-in novel for Paizo Publishing. Since 2016 he is also part of the team of writers working on George R. R. Martin's Wild Cards anthology series. The Highway Kind, a fantasy road trip novel, was announced for publication in 2018 by Tor Books but has not yet seen print. Gladstone's novel Empress of Forever, a space opera, was published in 2019.

Gladstone's novella This Is How You Lose the Time War, written with Amal El-Mohtar, won the 2019 BSFA Award for Short Fiction and the 2019 Nebula Award for Best Novella.

Bibliography

Novels 

 Empress of Forever (2019), 
 Last Exit (2022),

Novellas 
 This Is How You Lose the Time War (with Amal El-Mohtar, 2019),

The Craft Sequence

In order of publication
Three Parts Dead (2012), 
Two Serpents Rise (2013), 
Full Fathom Five (2014), 
Last First Snow (2015), 
Four Roads Cross (2016), 
Ruin of Angels (2017), 

In internal chronological order
Last First Snow
Two Serpents Rise
Three Parts Dead
Four Roads Cross
Full Fathom Five
The Ruin of Angels

The Craft Wars
Dead Country (2023),

Serial fiction 
 Bookburners (created by Gladstone)
Bookburners Season One (with Margaret Dunlap, Mur Lafferty, and Brian Francis Slattery) (2017)
 Episode 1: "Badge, Book, and Candle" (2015)
 Episode 7: "Now and Then" (2015)
 Episode 11: "Codex Umbra" (2015)
 Episode 16: "Siege" (2015)
 Bookburners Season Two (with Dunlap, Lafferty, Slattery, Andrea Phillips, and Amal El-Mohtar)
 Episode 1: "Creepy Town" (2016)
 Episode 6: "Incognita" (2016)
 Episode 13: "The End of the Day" (2016)
Bookburners Season Three (with Dunlap, Lafferty, Phillips, and Slattery)
Episode 1: "Bubbles of Earth" (2017)
Episode 6: "Oracle Bones" (2017)
Episode 13: "Live in London" (2017)
Bookburners Season Four (with Dunlap, Lafferty, Phillips, and Slattery)
Episode 1: "Body Problems" (2018)
Episode 10: "Alexandria Leaving" (2018)
 The Witch Who Came in From the Cold (co-created by Gladstone & Lindsay Smith)
The Witch Who Came in From the Cold Season One (with Lindsay Smith, Cassandra Rose Clarke, Ian Tregillis, and Michael Swanwick) (forthcoming, 2017)
 Episode 1: "A Long, Cold Winter" (with Lindsay Smith, 2016)
 Episode 3: "Double Blind" (2016)
 Episode 9: "Head Case" (2016)
 Episode 13: "Company Time" (with Lindsay Smith, 2016)
 The Witch Who Came in From the Cold Season Two (with Smith, Clarke, Tregillis, and Fran Wilde)
 Episode 2: "Complicating Factors" (2017)
 Episode 8: "What's Gone, What's Left Behind" (2017)
 Episode 11: "Absent Friends" (2017)

Interactive fiction 
Choice of the Deathless (2013)
Deathless: The City's Thirst (2015)
Both games, published by Choice of Games, are set in the Craft Sequence universe.

Short fiction 
"The Mask on the Island", On The Premises Magazine #3 (2007)
"On Starlit Seas", The Book of Exodi, ed. Michael K. Eidson (2009)
"The Four Modernizations", Necrotic Tissue #9 (2010)
"Drona's Death", xo Orpheus: 50 New Myths, ed. Kate Bernheimer (2013)
"The Angelus Guns", Tor.com, ed. Marco Palmieri (2014)
"A Kiss With Teeth", Tor.com, ed. Marco Palmieri,  (2014)
"Man in the Middle", Shared Nightmares, eds. Steven Diamond an Nathan Shumate (2014) 
"Late Nights at the Cape and Cane", Uncanny Magazine (2014)
"The Iron Man", The Grimm Future, ed. Erin Underwood (2016)
"Big Thrull and the Askin’ Man", Uncanny Magazine (2016)
"Giants in the Sky", The Starlit Wood, eds. Dominik Parisien and Navah Wolfe (2016)
"The Scholast in the Low Waters Kingdom", Tor.com, ed. Marco Palmieri (2017)
"Crispin's Model", Tor.com, ed. Marco Palmieri (2017)
"To a Cloven Pie", Robots vs. Fairies, eds. Dominik Parisien and Navah Wolfe (2018)
"Fitting In: A Wild Cards Story", Tor.com, ed. George R. R. Martin (2018)
"The Secret Life of Rubberband", Texas Hold'em, ed. George R. R. Martin (2018)

References

External links 

Max Gladstone at the Internet Speculative Fiction Database

21st-century American novelists
American fantasy writers
American male novelists
Living people
1984 births
21st-century American male writers
Nebula Award winners
Hugo Award-winning writers